Abdul Rahim Mrad is a Lebanese Sunni politician. He was born in 1942. A former minister, he is the founder of the Lebanese International University (in 2001). He is the leader of the Union Party.

He studied Business Administration and Law. Mourad lived in São Paulo, Brazil for five years

Mourad was inducted to parliament in 1990, replacing Nazem Qadri. He was elected to parliament in the 1992, 1996, 2000, 2018, 2022 elections. He served in a number of ministerial positions: Minister for Professional Education and Technical Training in 1994, Education and Higher Learning in 2000, Minister of State in 2003 and Minister of Defense from 2004 to 2005. He stood as the March 8 Alliance candidate for a Sunni seat in West Bekaa-Rachaya in the 2009 Lebanese general election, obtaining 29,095 votes (45.1%).

References

 

1942 births
Living people
Defense ministers of Lebanon
Education ministers of Lebanon
Lebanese Sunni politicians
Members of the Parliament of Lebanon
Independent politicians in Lebanon
Higher education ministers of Lebanon
Ministers without portfolio of Lebanon
Founders of universities
Lebanese expatriates in Brazil